Emak-Bakia (Basque for Leave me alone) is a 1926 film directed by Man Ray.  Subtitled as a cinépoéme, it features many techniques Man Ray used in his still photography (for which he is better known), including Rayographs, double exposure, soft focus and ambiguous features.

Synopsis
Emak-Bakia shows elements of fluid mechanical motion in parts, rotating artifacts showing his ideas of everyday objects being extended and rendered useless. Kiki of Montparnasse (Alice Prin) is shown driving a car in a scene through a town. Towards the middle of the film Jacques Rigaut appears dressed in female clothing and make-up. Later in the film a caption appears: "La raison de cette extravagance" (the reason for this extravagance). The film then cuts to a car arriving and a passenger leaving with briefcase entering a building, opening the case revealing men's shirt collars which he proceeds to tear in half. The collars are then used as a focus for the film, rotating through double exposures.

Notes
The film features sculptures by Pablo Picasso, and some of Man Ray's mathematical objects both still and animated using a stop motion technique.
Originally a silent film, recent copies have been dubbed using music taken from Man Ray's personal record collection of the time. The musical reconstruction was by Jacques Guillot.
When the film was first exhibited, a man in the audience stood up to complain it was giving him a headache and hurting his eyes. Another man told him to shut up, and they both started to fight. The theatre turned into a frenzy, the fighting ended up out in the street, and the police were called in to stop the riot.
Emak bakia can also mean "give peace" ("emak" is the imperative form of the verb "eman", which means "give") in Basque.
In 2012, Spanish director Oskar Alegria directed a feature-length documentary film La Casa Emak Bakia which details his search for the house where Emak Bakia was filmed.

References

Sources
 Chris Dashiell, Flicks (March 2001)

See also
Cinéma Pur
Dadaist poets
Surrealist cinema

External links

Downloadable version of the film at ubu.com

1926 films
Films directed by Man Ray
French silent short films
French black-and-white films
1920s French films